Dermatophyllum secundiflorum is a species of flowering shrub or small tree in the family Fabaceae that is native to the Southwestern United States (Texas, New Mexico) and Mexico (Chihuahua and Coahuila south to Hidalgo, Puebla, and Querétaro). Its common names include Texas mountain laurel, Texas mescalbean, frijolito, and frijolillo.

Name
Although "mescalbean" is among the plant's common appellations, it bears no relation to the Agave species used to make the spirit mezcal, nor to the peyote cactus (Lophophora williamsii), which contains the hallucinogenic alkaloid mescaline.

Description
An evergreen, its leaves are pinnately compound, with small, roughly spatulate leaflets; the leaflets are rather thick, and waxy to the touch. Never tall, and rarely having a straight trunk, its bark is smooth in all but the oldest specimens.

Extremely fragrant purple flowers, resembling the smell of grape soda, are produced in large clusters in March and April. They are followed by  pods containing deep orange seeds.

Habitat
It is well-adapted to arid and semiarid habitats, but is most common in riparian zones.

Uses
D. secundiflorum is a popular ornamental plant due to its showy flowers and orange seeds. The reddish wood it produces is potentially useful, but as yet has little commercial value.

Further adding to this is the fact that the beans were once used by some Native American tribes as a hallucinogen, before being supplanted by peyote. This plant does not contain any mescaline, however; all parts of it are highly poisonous, due to the principal alkaloid cytisine, which is chemically related to nicotine. The consumption of a single seed is enough to kill an adult.

References

External links

Erowid mescal vault (Accessed 2/26/06)
Dermatophyllum secundiflorum (as Sophora secundiflora)
NRCS: USDA Plants Profile Dermatophyllum secundiflorum (as Calia secundiflora)

Faboideae
Plants described in 1967
Flora of Texas
Trees of the South-Central United States
Trees of Northeastern Mexico
Flora of the Rio Grande valleys
Trees of Coahuila
Trees of Chihuahua (state)
Trees of Hidalgo (state)
Trees of Puebla
Trees of Querétaro
Flora of the Mexican Plateau
Flora of the Chihuahuan Desert
Entheogens
Native American religion